Robert Dalzell may refer to:

 Robert Dalzell, 1st Lord Dalzell (c. 1550–1636), Scottish nobleman
 Robert Dalzell, 1st Earl of Carnwath (1611–1654), Scottish nobleman and Royalist supporter
 Robert Dalzell (British Army officer, born 1662) (1662–1758), British Army general
 Robert Dalzell, 5th Earl of Carnwath (1687–1737), Scottish nobleman and Jacobite supporter
 Robert Dalzell, 6th Earl of Carnwath (1768–1839), Scottish nobleman and soldier
 Robert Dalzell (British Army officer, born 1816) (1816–1878), British Army officer
 Robert Dalzell, 11th Earl of Carnwath (1847–1910) 
 Sir Robert Dalzell, 1st Baronet (1639–1686), Scottish politician

See also
 Robert Dalziel (disambiguation)
 Sir Robert Dalyell, 8th Baronet